Dawid Banaczek (born 3 June 1979) is a Polish former professional footballer who played as an attacking midfielder or forward.

Early life
Dawid was born in Gdynia and grew up in Gdańsk (both being parts of Tricity urban area in Poland). Dawid's father, Ryszard, was a rugby Polish national team player and then a rugby coach in Lechia Gdańsk, while his mother Barbara was a volleyball player. Dawid is the eldest of two boys.

Early career
Banaczek made his first appearance for Lechia Gdańsk where he began his trainings in 1987.
As a teenager, Banaczek represented Poland U16 to U21. In 1995, he participated in the U16 European Championships, held in Belgium.

Playing career
He had played in the Lechia senior team for three seasons. In 1999, Banaczek signed a 2-year contract with Bayern Munich II. In the new club, Dawid played for two seasons for the reserves team.

In 2001, he had signed a contract with the Swedish club IFK Norrköping in which he debuted in Allsvenskan. Between 2001 and 2003, Banaczek (with a short, three-month interval in RKS Radomsko), played continuously for the IFK.

In 2005, he moved to Ekstraklasa side Amica Wronki. Under supervision of coach Maciej Skorża, he spent one round as a substitute.

He enjoyed his greatest successes as a player in Zagłębie Lubin, with whom, in the 2006–07 season, he won the championship of Poland. A year prior, Zagłębie finished the season in 3rd. Beside Zagłębie and Amica Wronki, Banaczek played in two more teams of the Ekstraklasa: RKS Radomsko and Widzew Łódź.

The last high-level stop in his football career was the Czech team Sigma Olomouc, whom he joined in 2007.

National team
He was repeatedly a member of Polish youth national teams, from U15 to U21. In 1995, under coach Andrzej Zamilski, he participated in the European U16 Championship in Belgium.

Managerial career

Lechia Gdańsk
In 2012, Dawid Banaczek started cooperation with Lechia Gdańsk, where he led the team of the Lechia Gdańsk Football Academy U9.

Kaszubia Koscierzyna
On 1 July 2013, Banaczek assumed the position of the head coach of the Kaszubia Kościerzyna, on a one-year deal.

Lechia Gdańsk
From July to August 2015 he was the head coach of Lechia Gdańsk's U17 team.

After 8 weeks of working with U17s, he became the assistant for Thomas von Heesen in the senior team. Following von Heesen's dismissal, he became the caretaker manager on 3 December 2015.

From 1 July 2016, he was an assistant coach of Drutex Bytovia Bytów.

Personal life
Dawid is married to Anna Iga. Together they have a daughter Laura, who is an artistic gymnast in SGA Gdynia.

In 2011, Dawid Banaczek has established the Football Pro Academy. The principal goal of the academy, to be achieved within several years, is to search for talents and children with passion and enthusiasm to practice this sport, and subsequently, beginning of trainings on a more advanced level.

Banaczek speaks English and German.

Honours
Zagłębie Lubin
Ekstraklasa: 2006–07

External links
 

1979 births
Living people
Polish footballers
Poland youth international footballers
Poland under-21 international footballers
Polish expatriate footballers
Ekstraklasa players
Allsvenskan players
Football League (Greece) players
Lechia Gdańsk players
Lechia Gdańsk II players
FC Bayern Munich II players
IFK Norrköping players
Widzew Łódź players
FC Vaduz players
Amica Wronki players
Zagłębie Lubin players
SK Sigma Olomouc players
Ethnikos Asteras F.C. players
FC Viktoria Köln players
RKS Radomsko players
Kaszubia Kościerzyna players
Expatriate footballers in Germany
Expatriate footballers in Liechtenstein
Expatriate footballers in Sweden
Expatriate footballers in Greece
Polish expatriate sportspeople in Germany
Polish expatriate sportspeople in Sweden
Polish expatriate sportspeople in Greece
Association football midfielders
Association football forwards
Sportspeople from Gdynia
Polish football managers
Lechia Gdańsk managers
Ekstraklasa managers
Polish expatriate sportspeople in Liechtenstein